The 2020–21 BBL-Pokal was the 54th season of the BBL-Pokal, the domestic cup competition of the Basketball Bundesliga (BBL).

Bayern Munich defeated Alba Berlin in the final to win their third title.

Participants
The sixteen highest placed teams from the 2019–20 Basketball Bundesliga, without the relegated teams and promoted teams, qualified for the tournament.

Format
The format was changed for this season because of the COVID-19 pandemic. The 16 teams were split into four qualification tournaments of four teams (North and South). The winner of each tournament qualified for the final four.

Standings

Round and draw dates

Qualification tournament
The teams were split into a "North" and "South" zone and played a four-team tournament at a pre-selected venue. The draw was held on 3 September 2020.

The first placed team in each tournament qualified for the final four.

Due to the COVID-19 pandemic, some games were played behind closed doors.

Group A

The game was called off after the standings were decided priot to the game. As a result, both teams lost 0–40.

Group B

Group C

Group D

Final four
The final four was postponed on 21 October 2020. It was scheduled to take place on 17 and April 2021, but was postponed again. The games took place on 15 and 16 May 2021.

Bracket

Semifinals

Final

See also
2019–20 Basketball Bundesliga

Notes

References

External links
Official website 

BBL-Pokal seasons
BBL-Pokal